Secrets of the Muse is an album by Jordan Rudess recorded and released in 1997.

The album is composed entirely of improvisations on various synthesizers.  Improvisation is something that Rudess is well acquainted with, as seen in 4NYC and Christmas Sky both released in 2002.  The sound of the album is different from most of Rudess' carefully composed pieces as it takes on a slower, softer, more gentle approach.

Track listing
All pieces are composed by Jordan Rudess.
"Stillness" – 3:09
"Deepest Love" – 4:20
"Autumn Fire" – 3:40
"Gentle Ways" – 3:45	
"Footpath" – 3:43	
"Virgin Snow" – 2:54	
"Darkness" – 3:54	
"Drifting East" – 4:08	
"A Call For Beauty" – 3:31	
"Cradle Song" – 4:04	
"New Life" – 4:15	
"So It Is" – 2:51	
"Sunset Swingset" – 3:03

Personnel
Jordan Rudess - Piano, Synthesizer

1997 albums
Jordan Rudess albums